Lebogang Shange (born 1 August 1990) is a South African race walker. His biggest success is the fourth place  in the 2017 World Championships.

He personal best in the 20 kilometres walk is 1:19:18 set at the 2017 IAAF World Championship in London. This is the current national record.

Competition record

References

1990 births
Living people
South African male racewalkers
World Athletics Championships athletes for South Africa
Place of birth missing (living people)
Athletes (track and field) at the 2015 African Games
Athletes (track and field) at the 2016 Summer Olympics
Athletes (track and field) at the 2018 Commonwealth Games
Olympic athletes of South Africa
African Games gold medalists for South Africa
African Games medalists in athletics (track and field)
South African Athletics Championships winners
Commonwealth Games competitors for South Africa